Catocala intacta is a moth of the family Erebidae. It is found in Japan and Taiwan.

The wingspan is 58–60 mm.

Subspecies
Catocala intacta intacta
Catocala intacta taiwana Sugi, 1965 (Taiwan)

References

External links
Species info

intacta
Moths of Asia
Moths described in 1889